Methylobacterium isbiliense  is a bacterium from the genus of Methylobacterium which has been isolated from drinking water in Sevilla in Spain.

References

Further reading

External links
Type strain of Methylobacterium isbiliense at BacDive -  the Bacterial Diversity Metadatabase

Hyphomicrobiales
Bacteria described in 2005